Council for Chemical Research is an organization based in Washington, DC, whose membership represents the U.S. chemical research enterprise. CCR was formed in 1979 to promote cooperation in basic research and encourage high-quality education in the chemical sciences and chemical engineering. CCR's membership currently comprises more than 120 companies, universities, and government laboratories with a combined R&D budget of more than $7 billion.

Origins 
The Council for Chemical Research was created in 1979 when Malcolm Pruitt, then VP for research at The Dow Chemical Company, convened the first meeting of research executives from the nation's major chemical companies and research universities. The goal was to improve trust and collaboration between the public and private sector research communities. The association was incorporated in 1980 as the "Chemical Research Council, Inc."  The members of the Founding Board were M.E. Pruitt (Dow Chemical), E.C. Galloway (Stauffer Chemical), S.A. Heininger (Monsanto), J.L. Kice (Texas Tech University), C.J. King (UC Berkeley), A.L. Kwiram (Washington), J.R. Lovett (Air Products and Chemicals), J.F. Mathis (Exxon), W.M. Risen Jr. (Brown University), K.A. Smith (MIT) and L.J. Thomas (Eastman Kodak).

CCR is a 501(c)(3) non-profit organization.

CCR has four membership categories: Industrial, Academic, Government Labs, and Affiliates.

Mission and activities 
CCR's mission is "Advancing Chemical Innovation Through Collaboration and Advocacy."

CCR serves as a catalyst and partner for initiatives in the field of chemical research, such as the Center for Process Analytical Chemistry and Chemical Industry Vision 2020.

CCR produces and sponsors studies such as Measuring Up: Research and Development Counts for the Chemical Industry and Measure for Measure: Chemical R&D Powers the U.S. Innovation Engine.

CCR holds an Annual Meeting, an annual New Industrial Chemistry and Engineering Conference (NIChE), and workshops on topics such as Intellectual Property Issues.

CCR works with the US President, US Congress and federal agencies and research labs on public policy issues within its area of expertise, and writes position statements annually on the budget for federal agencies which fund research in the chemical sciences.

Awards 
CCR's Malcolm Pruitt Award recognizes, "...outstanding contributions to the progress of chemistry and chemical engineering by promotion of mutually beneficial interactions among universities, the chemical industry, and government."

CCR's Collaboration Success Award recognizes, "...a collaborative team that has made outstanding contributions to the progress of chemistry-related science and/or engineering."

CCR's Diversity Award recognizes, "...an individual who has directly impacted organizational ability to advance and promote diversity..."

Action networks 
Much of CCR's work is accomplished by volunteer representatives who participate in Action Networks. Action Networks are knowledge-action communities of CCR members and colleagues, led by a three-person team of government, industry, and university volunteer leaders. Each Action Network develops and executes the activities which advance their goal.

There are 3 Action Networks:

CCR Action Network to Advance Research Investment
CCR Action Network to Advocate Research Collaboration
CCR Action Network to Enrich Graduate Education

CCR Chairs 

 2016 Kelly Sullivan
 2015 Jeffrey Reimer
 2014 Eric Lin
 2013 Marc Donohue
 2012 Wayne Ranbom
 2011 Terry Ring
 2010 Seth Snyder
 2009 Gregory Girolami
 2008 John McDermott
 2007 Joan Brennecke
 2006 Randolph Guschl
 2005 Robert Armstrong
 2004 Alan P. Sylwester
 2003 Esin Gulari
 2002 Richard M. Gross
 2001 Alexis T. Bell
 2000 David R. Rea
 1999 Jean H. Futrell
 1998 Gary E. McGraw
 1997 Ronald W. Rousseau
 1996 Thomas A. Manuel
 1995 Harry A. Morrison
 1994 L. Louis Hegedus
 1993 Thomas F. Edgar
 1992 Roy D. Gerard
 1991 J. Ivan Legg
 1990 Herbert S. Eleuterio
 1989 C. Judson King
 1988 E. Charles Galloway
 1987 Paul G. Gassman
 1986 Klaus L. Mai
 1985 Kenneith B. Bischoff
 1984 W. James Porter
 1983 Alvin L. Kwiram
 1982 Malcolm E. Pruitt
 1981 Malcolm E. Pruitt

References

External links
Council for Chemical Research website
Chemical Industry Vision 2020
AIChE
American Chemical Society

Research organizations in the United States
Chemistry organizations
1979 establishments in the United States
Scientific organizations established in 1979
Scientific organizations based in the United States